Il Menabò di letteratura was an Italian cultural and literary magazine published between 1959 and 1967. It was based in Turin, Italy.

History and profile
Il Menabò di letteratura was established in 1959. Its founders were Elio Vittorini and Italo Calvino. The first issue appeared in July 1959. Elio Vittorini and Italo Calvino edited the magazine until 1966. The magazine, published by Giulio Einaudi, had its headquarters in Torino. It covered monographic topics and included writings of novice Italian authors. It also featured writings on newly developed critical literary theories, including Roland Barthes' theory. It had a left-wing and militant stance.

The magazine ceased publication in 1967.

See also
 List of magazines in Italy

References

1959 establishments in Italy
1967 disestablishments in Italy
Defunct literary magazines published in Italy
Giulio Einaudi Editore books
Italo Calvino
Italian-language magazines
Magazines established in 1959
Magazines disestablished in 1967
Magazines published in Turin
Socialist magazines